Thomas Glave is an American author who has published widely and won numerous awards. He is also a university professor.

Biography 
Born to Jamaican parents in The Bronx, New York, Glave grew up there and in Kingston, Jamaica. He earned a B.A. degree from Bowdoin College in 1993 (Cum laude, English and Latin American Studies) and a Master of Fine Arts degree in Creative Writing from Brown University in 1998. He is a member of the English faculty at the Binghamton University, where he teaches creative writing and courses on Caribbean, African-American, black British, postcolonial, and L.G.B.T./queer literatures, among other topics. Glave possesses dual Jamaican and U.S. citizenship. He is gay.

Awards
A two-time New York Foundation for the Arts Fellow, Glave's early short story, "The Final Inning", originally published in The Kenyon Review, won an O. Henry Award in 1997 while Glave was a graduate student at Brown University. With this award, Glave became the second and only gay African American writer, after James Baldwin, to have won an O. Henry Award. "The Final Inning" appears in Glave's first fiction collection, Whose Song? and Other Stories, published by City Lights in 2000.  Glave's essay collection Words to Our Now: Imagination and Dissent followed Whose Song? in 2005, and won a Lambda Literary Award in 2006. Glave earned a second Lambda Literary Award in 2009 for his groundbreaking anthology, Our Caribbean: A Gathering of Lesbian and Gay Writing from the Antilles (Duke University Press, 2008). The Torturer's Wife, published by City Lights in 2008, was shortlisted and named a finalist for the Dayton Literary Peace Prize, the Stonewall Book Award, the William Saroyan International Prize for Writing, and the Lambda Literary Award.

Glave has also earned a Fine Arts Work Center in Provincetown Fellowship (1995–96) and a Fulbright Fellowship to Jamaica (1998–99). While in Jamaica that year, he worked on issues of social justice, and helped found the Jamaica Forum for Lesbians, All-Sexuals, and Gays (J-FLAG). In 2008 he was invited to MIT to teach as Martin Luther King Jr. Visiting Professor in the Program in Writing and Humanistic Studies. In 2009 he was named an Out Magazine "100" honoree. He has been a visiting fellow at Clare Hall, University of Cambridge (2012–13), and Leverhulme Trust Visiting Professor in the Department of Hispanic Studies at the University of Warwick (2014–15).

Publications
Glave is the author of Whose Song? and Other Stories (City Lights, 2000), The Torturer's Wife (City Lights, 2008), the essay collection Words to Our Now: Imagination and Dissent (University of Minnesota Press, 2005), and is editor of the anthology Our Caribbean: A Gathering of Lesbian and Gay Writing from the Antilles (Duke University Press, 2008).

Whose Song? garnered considerable praise upon its publication, drawing admiration from writers like Nadine Gordimer, Gloria Naylor, Clarence Major, and in reviews in publications like The New York Times Book Review, The Washington Post, the San Francisco Chronicle, the Hartford Courant, and The Globe and Mail.

Among the Bloodpeople: Politics and Flesh Paperback – July 2, 2013 Named a finalist for the 2014 Lambda Literary Award in LGBT Nonfiction!
Included in the 2014 Over the Rainbow list
Selected by Publishers Weekly as a Pick of the Week (July 1, 2013)!
Selected by The Airship/Black Balloon Publishing as a Best Book of 2013
"This collection is wide-ranging, moving from the Caribbean (Jamaica in particular) to Cambridge, England, and from poetry to sex to discrimination."—Library Journal (BEA Editors' Picks feature)

References

External links

 Interview with Thomas Glave
 Thomas Glave Papers are held at the Schomburg Center for Research in Black Culture, New York Public Library.

Living people
Jamaican non-fiction writers
American people of Jamaican descent
LGBT African Americans
Brown University alumni
Bowdoin College alumni
American gay writers
Jamaican LGBT writers
LGBT people from New York (state)
Lambda Literary Award winners
1964 births
Binghamton University faculty